The Devils Backbone Wilderness is one of eight wilderness areas protected and preserved in the U.S. State of Missouri. The United States Congress designated the wilderness area in 1980, and it now has a total of 6,595 acres (26 km2).  Devil's Backbone is located within the Willow Springs section of the Ava-Cassville-Willow Springs Ranger District, of the Mark Twain National Forest, near Willow Springs, Missouri. It was named for a prominent ridge down the center of the area. Horseback riding is popular on a network of trails in the wilderness.

Devils Backbone offers a variety of recreational activities for visitors. In the spring season, dogwood, redbud, and serviceberry trees are flowering in full force. Then, in fall the foliage of the oaks, sassafras, and red maples begin to turn a vast array of reds, yellows, and oranges.

The North Fork River is also main attraction for visitors to the area. There are three springs within Devils Backbone that feed the North Fork (Blue, Amber, and McGarr). There is even a canoe launch for the river which offers smallmouth bass, blue gill, and rock bass angling opportunities.

For those interested in wildlife, White-tailed deer (Odocoileus virginiana), red and grey fox (Vulpes vulpes and Urycyon cinereoargenteus), bobcats (Lynx  rufus), skunks (Mephitis mephitis), squirrels (Sciurus niger and S. carolinensis), coyotes (Canis latrans), and raccoons (Procyon lotor) can be seen roaming the limestone glades. Visitors, especially hikers should be aware of potentially threatening (but easily avoided) copperhead snakes (Agkistrodon contortrix) and Eastern timber rattlesnakes (Crotalus horridus) are likewise commonly seen.

See also 
 List of U.S. Wilderness Areas

External links 
 
 

IUCN Category Ib
Protected areas of Ozark County, Missouri
Wilderness areas of Missouri
Mark Twain National Forest